Jeffrey Chad Smith or Jeff Smith, is an American hedge fund manager who headed Starboard Value since April 2011.
In 2014, William Cohan of Fortune called Smith "[t]he most feared man in corporate America."

Early life and education
Smith grew up in Great Neck, Long Island. His mother was a real estate broker, and his father founded the Fresh Juice Company. In 1994, Smith received a degree in economics from the Wharton School at the University of Pennsylvania.

Career
Smith began his career in the mergers and acquisitions department at Société Générale. From August 1994 to February 1996, he worked as a financial analyst in the mergers and acquisitions department at LSG Advisors. He was vice president of strategic development and investor relations at Fresh Juice from February 1996 to January 1998, becoming its director in April 1996.

After Fresh Juice was sold in 1998, Smith moved to Ramius Capital, a hedge fund and private equity firm founded by Peter A. Cohen. Smith served as a partner and managing director at Ramius. In 2002, he and a colleague, Mark Mitchell, launched the Starboard Value investment strategy at Ramius. Smith became executive managing director of Cowen Group in January 2004. Peter Hart joined the Starboard Value division in 2005. In 2008, Ramius merged with Cowen Group.

Starboard Value
In 2011, Starboard went independent, with Smith as CEO.

On September 12, 2017, Smith said that Perrigo, a manufacturer of store-brand pharmaceuticals, and Altaba, formerly Yahoo, were his favorite stock picks.

Other positions 
Smith served as chairman of the board of Phoenix Technologies from November 2009 to November 2010. He was director of S1 Corporation from May 3, 2006 to September 2008, of Kensey Nash from December 2007 to February 2009, of Actel from March 18, 2009 to October 2010, and of Zoran from March 2011 to August 2011. 

He served as a director of SurModics from January 2011 to August 2012, as independent director of Regis Corporation from October 2011 to October 2013, and as a director of Quantum from May 2013 to May 2015. He has been director of AOL since May 2012. He was independent non-executive chairman of Darden Restaurants, from October 2014 to April 2016 and has been that firm's director since October 2014. 

He has been independent director of Advance Auto Parts, since November 2015, and its independent chairman since May 2016. He served as an independent director of Yahoo! from April 2016 to June 2017 and an independent director of Perrigo since February 2017. He has also served on the boards of Jotter Technologies and Office Depot.

References

Year of birth missing (living people)
Living people
American chief executives of financial services companies
Chief investment officers
People from Great Neck, New York
Wharton School of the University of Pennsylvania alumni